Shawn Beveney (born 27 March 1982) is a Guyanese footballer who plays for Haringey Borough F.C.

Career
Beveney was voted in the best five players playing non-League football in March 2009 by leading non-league journalists.

Beveney made his competitive debut for Cray Wanderers in their 4–0 Kent Senior Cup defeat to Ebbsfleet United, and scored on his league début against Godalming Town.

After a thigh injury, Beveney was named to the bench on 27 December, against Kingstonian, but did not play. He finally made his return off the bench at home to Dulwich Hamlet, but after the injury, Shawn was released by the club.

Beveney was released by Lewes in late July.

Beveney moving to Ashford Town (Kent) once fully fit. He scored a hat-trick on his début.

Beveney come plays for Dulwich Hamlet He was granted a full British work permit.

After a spell on trial at Grimsby Town, Beveney returned to Cray Wanderers in October 2009 for their first season in the Isthmian League Premier Division. Beveney was signed on a year contract by TT Pro League Caledonia AIA Where Beveney scored 11 goals in 33 games.

Shawn spent part of the 2010-11 season with Billericay Town scoring a single goal for the club which came in a 3-0 win over Hastings United.

Beveney joined Enfield Town in October 2014, before joining Brentwood Town on loan in December 2014. He joined Heybridge Swifts in February 2015.

Position
He plays striker or central midfield for his country but plays as a striker at club level.

International career
Beveney has captained Guyana national football team 19 times. He returned from international duty on 25 June 2008 after a man of the match performance in a friendly against Trinidad and Tobago.

References

External links
 

Living people
1982 births
Guyanese footballers
Guyana international footballers
Guyanese expatriate footballers
Association football midfielders
Expatriate footballers in England
Expatriate footballers in Trinidad and Tobago
Cray Wanderers F.C. players
Ashford United F.C. players
Billericay Town F.C. players
Guyanese expatriate sportspeople in England
Guyanese expatriate sportspeople in Trinidad and Tobago
TT Pro League players
Sportspeople from Georgetown, Guyana
Western Tigers FC players